Brian Edward Kinsella (February 11, 1954 – October 14, 2018) was a Canadian ice hockey player. Drafted in 1974 by the Washington Capitals of the National Hockey League and Phoenix Roadrunners of the World Hockey Association, Kinsella played ten games in the NHL and played most of his professional hockey career in the minors. He is also known by many as "The Big Bear Cat."

Kinsella was born in Barrie, Ontario. In addition to his playing career, Kinsella was head coach of St. Francis de Sales School  hockey team from 2007-2012. Kinsella retired after guiding St. Francis for five seasons and leading the team to its first hockey state title in school history in 2011. In his first season he led the Knights to a Frozen Four berth in the OHSAA Ice Hockey State Tournament.

Kinsella died October 14, 2018 at his home in Fort Myers, Florida.

Career statistics

References

External links

Profile at hockeydraftcentral.com
St. Francis hockey coach Kinsella retires

1954 births
2018 deaths
Canadian ice hockey right wingers
Dayton Gems players
Ice hockey people from Simcoe County
Oshawa Generals players
Phoenix Roadrunners draft picks
Sportspeople from Barrie
Washington Capitals draft picks
Washington Capitals players